Antiochus (180 – 170 BC) was a Hellenistic monarch of the Seleucid Empire reigning between 175 and 170 BC.

Biography
Antiochus' year of birth is not specified by ancient historians, but his portrait known from his coins indicate that he was approximately five years old when he assumed the throne in 175 BC. He was the younger son of King Seleucus IV and his wife Laodice IV. The Empire was obligated by the 188 BC Treaty of Apamea, signed after King Antiochus III lost a war against the Romans, to send a hostage to Rome; at first, Antiochus' uncle Antiochus IV was sent as a hostage. After Antiochus III's death in 187 BC, Seleucus IV replaced his brother Antiochus IV with his own eldest son and heir Demetrius I, since Rome considered it important that a son of the reigning king be a hostage. The exchange took place before 178 BC. 

The death of Seleucus IV in 175 BC and the presence of Demetrius I in Rome led to the young Antiochus' proclamation as king, but the minister Heliodorus who probably killed Seleucus IV held the real power. Antiochus IV soon arrived in Syria and proclaimed himself a co-ruler, in a succession that was illegal. Antiochus IV disposed of Heliodorus and kept his nephew in the shadow. The young Antiochus died in 170/169 BC (145 SE), possibly on the orders of Antiochus IV.

Notes

References

Citations

Sources

180 BC births
170 BC deaths

Seleucid rulers

2nd-century BC Seleucid rulers

2nd-century BC rulers in Asia
2nd-century BC Babylonian kings

Kings of Syria